Friendship is a studio album by American singer and pianist Ray Charles. It was produced by Billy Sherrill and released in August 1984 by Columbia Records and Epic Records. The album peaked at number 1 on the Billboard Top Country Albums chart.

The album was one of several in the mid-1980s that featured Charles returning to country music after a two-decade absence; he had previously recorded the two-volume Modern Sounds in Country and Western Music to much acclaim in 1962. For Friendship, Charles collaborated with several established country stars in a series of duets. Whereas the Modern Sounds singles were not explicitly released to country radio, the singles from Friendship were, and the album provided Charles with his highest-charting hits on the country charts, including a number-one country hit with Willie Nelson, "Seven Spanish Angels".

Release and reception 

Friendship was first released in August 1984 by Columbia Records and Epic Records. It reached the number-one position on the Billboards Top Country Albums and remained on the chart for 70 weeks. According to Stephen Thomas Erlewine, the album was "a big hit, really the last genuine hit when Charles was alive", as well as "the pinnacle of his '80s country-pop records, the one where Ray truly captured the sound of the era". It was later reissued by Columbia as Ray Charles and Friends' Super Hits. In 2005, Friendship was reissued again by Columbia in partnership with Legacy Recordings.

In a retrospective review for AllMusic, Erlewine judged the album's best moments to be "merely pleasant; at its worst, it's simply dull" and "more of a testament to the power of Sherrill's Music City machine than it is to Charles' greatness." Robert Christgau was more enthusiastic reviewing the album's 2005 reissue, saying the duet concept worked "pretty darn good on the only memorable album of his Nashville foray". He cited "We Didn't See a Thing" as a highlight of both Charles and George Jones' late-period recordings and also applauded the two bonus songs, despite their deviation from the original album's stylistic concept.

Track listing

Personnel
Ray Charles – vocals
Billy Sanford (tracks: A1), Dale Sellers (tracks: A5), Pete Bordonali (tracks: A1, A2, A4, B1, B2, B4), Reggie Young (tracks: A3, B3) - electric guitar
Billy Sanford (tracks: A2, A4, A5, B1 to B5), Dale Sellers (tracks: A1 to A4, B1, B2, B4, B5), Jerry Kennedy (track: A5), Pete Bordonali (tracks: A3, B3), Ricky Skaggs (track: B1) - acoustic guitar
Bob Wray (tracks: A5, B1, B2, B5), Henry Strzelecki (tracks: A1 to A4, B3, B4) - bass guitar
Bobby Ogdin (track: A3), Bobby Wood (track: A1), Hargus "Pig" Robbins (tracks: A2 to A5, B1 to B5) - keyboards
Buddy Emmons (tracks: A3, B3), Pete Drake (tracks: A1, A2, A4, A5, B1, B2, B4, B5) - steel guitar
Pete Bordonali (track: B5) - gut-string guitar
Jerry Douglas (tracks: B1), Pete Drake (tracks: A3, B3) - Dobro
Jerry Carrigan (tracks: A1, B2), Jerry Kroon (track: A4), Kenny Malone (tracks: A2, A3, A5, B1, B3 to B5) - drums
Ron Reynolds (tracks: A3, A4, B2), Terry McMillan (tracks: A2, A4, A5, B1, B3, B4) - percussion
Terry McMillan (tracks: A1 to A3, B2 to B5) - harmonica
Denis Solee (track: A1) - saxophone
Bill McElhiney (track: B5), Jose McElhiney (track: B5) - trumpet
Diane Tidwell (tracks: A1, A4, B5), Hurshel Wiginton (tracks: A1, A4, B4, B5), Judy Rodman (tracks: B4), Lisa Silver (tracks: A1, A4, B5), Louis Nunley (tracks: A1, A4, B4, B5), Wendy Suits (track: B4) - backing vocals
The "A" Strings (tracks: B2 to B5) - stings
Bill McElhiney - string arrangements, conductor

Charts

Weekly charts

Year-end charts

References

External links 
 

1984 albums
Ray Charles albums
Columbia Records albums
Albums produced by Billy Sherrill